The 1983 All-Big Ten Conference football team consists of American football players chosen by various organizations for All-Big Ten Conference teams for the 1983 college football season.  The 1983 Illinois Fighting Illini football team won the conference championship and had seven players selected as first-team player by either the Associated Press or United Press International.  Iowa followed with six first-team selections, including quarterback Chuck Long and linebacker Larry Station.  Michigan had five first-team players, including center Tom Dixon and guard Stefan Humphries.

Offensive selections

Quarterbacks
 Chuck Long, Iowa (AP-1; UPI-1)
 Jack Trudeau, Illinois (UPI-2)

Running backs
 Dwight Beverly, Illinois (AP-1; UPI-1)
 Keith Byars, Ohio State (AP-1; UPI-1)
 Rick Rogers, Michigan (UPI-2)
 Thomas Rooks, Illinois (UPI-2)
 Vaughn Broadnax, Ohio State (UPI-2)

Wide receivers
 Dave Moritz, Iowa (AP-1; UPI-1)
 Duane Gunn, Indiana (AP-1; UPI-2)
 Al Toon, Wisconsin (UPI-1)
 David Williams, Illinois (UPI-2)

Tight ends
 John Frank, Ohio State (AP-1; UPI-1)
 Tim Brewster, Illinois (UPI-2)

Centers
 Tom Dixon, Michigan (AP-1; UPI-1)
 Joel Hilgenberg, Iowa (UPI-2)

Guards
 Stefan Humphries, Michigan (AP-1; UPI-1)
 Jim Juriga, Illinois (AP-1; UPI-1)
 Joe Levelis, Iowa (UPI-2)
 Scott Zalenski, Ohio State (UPI-2)

Tackles
 Chris Babyar, Illinois (AP-1; UPI-1)
 John Alt, Iowa (AP-1)
 Mark Krerowicz, Ohio State (UPI-2)
 Bill Roberts, Ohio State (UPI-2)

Defensive selections

Defensive linemen
 Mark Butkus, Illinois (AP-1; UPI-1)
 Paul Hufford, Iowa (AP-1; UPI-1)
 Don Thorp, Illinois (AP-1; UPI-1)
 Al Sincich, Michigan (AP-1; UPI-2)
 Kevin Brooks, Michigan (UPI-1)
 Keith Cruise, Northwestern (UPI-2)
 Spencer Nelms, Ohio State (UPI-2)
 Chris Scott, Purdue (UPI-2)

Linebackers
 Carl Banks, Michigan State (AP-1; UPI-1)
 James Melka, Wisconsin (AP-1; UPI-1)
 Larry Station, Iowa (AP-1; UPI-1)
 Rowland Tatum, Ohio State (AP-1; UPI-1)
 Mike Mallory, Michigan (UPI-2)
 Carlton Rose, Michigan (UPI-2)
 Peter Najarian, Minnesota (UPI-2)
 Mike Winegrad, Illinois (UPI-2)

Defensive backs
 Craig Swoope, Illinois (AP-1; UPI-1)
 Evan Cooper, Michigan (AP-1; UPI-2)
 Garcia Lane, Ohio State (AP-1; UPI-2)
 Phil Parker, Michigan State (UPI-1)
 Mike Stoops, Iowa (UPI-1)
 Mike Heaven, Illinois (UPI-2)

Special teams

Placekicker
 Bob Bergeron, Michigan (AP-1)
 Chris White, Illinois (UPI-1)

Punter
 John Kidd, Northwestern (AP-1; UPI-1)
 Karl Edwards, Ohio State (UPI-2)

Key
Bold = Selected as a first-team player by both the media (AP) and coaches (UPI)

AP = Associated Press, "selected by a panel of sports writers and broadcasters covering the conference football scene"

UPI = United Press International, selected by the Big Ten Conference coaches

See also
1983 College Football All-America Team

References

All-Big Ten Conference
All-Big Ten Conference football teams